André Pijet is a Polish-Canadian editorial cartoonist whose satirical and humorous works have been published in Poland, Greece, Belgium, France, Great Britain, Italy, Turkey, the United States and Canada. In Quebec, he made a name for himself with a  series of cartoons related to the 1992-93 hockey playoffs which he produced for a major Montreal daily newspaper.

Biography
Pijet settled in Montreal, Quebec, in 1988. In his native Poland, his training in fine arts and photography, along with his innate talent for drawing, led very early to a career as an illustrator, caricaturist, cartoonist and painter. He received his bachelor's degree with a major in painting and drawing and minor in art history, and master's degree in art education from University Concordia. As a freelance artist, he works regularly with major advertising agencies and publishing companies. He is well known for his book illustrations and for his work as a graphic artist and art director. In parallel, during all the time he continues to search for his proper way to express his own perception of the contemporary world through painting and drawing, constantly exploring it theoretically and practically. His works have been published in a number of major exhibitions and have earned him a number of prizes abroad.

Awards 
 1984 : 2nd prize,'Suwalki, Poland
 1985 : 3rd prize – International Biennial of Graphic Art, Sofia, Bulgaria 
 1985 : 3rd prize, Suwalki, Poland
 1986 : Honourable Mention, Warsaw, Poland 
 1986 : 3rd prize, Zielona Gora, Poland
 1987 : Critic's Choice Award – Casino-Beringen, Belgium
 1989 : 4th prize, Ancona, Italy
 1991 : 4th prize, Ancona, Italy
 1993 : 4th prize, Ancona, Italy
 1996 : 1st prize for book of caricatures Toute vérité est bonne à rire, Casino-Beringen, Belgium
 1996 : Aydin Dogan Vakfi - Award of Success, Istanbul, Turkey
 1998 : Winner of the porcelain pencil for best foreign cartoonist, Saint-Just-Le-Martel, France
 1998 : 3rd prize – International Biennial of Caricature, Vercelli, Italy
 2000 : Honourable Mention - International Biennial of Caricature, Vercelli, Italy
 2001 : Winner of the porcelain pencil for best foreign book Piegé par l'amour, Saint-Just-Le-Martel, France
 2003 : The Prize of The Conseil General du Loiret - International Festival des Dessins Presse, Humour et Caricature, Orleans, France
 2008 : Prix Robert LaPalme, Exhibition 1001 Visages, Montreal, Quebec, Canada
 2009 : Honorable Mention, National Exposition of The Association of Polish Artists of Satirical Art SPAK, Theme: "Theater", Warsaw, Poland
 2009 : Prix The Small Lion, Polish Satirical Contest "Discover the Universe", Olsztyn, Poland
 2010 : Prize of Distinction in competition "Museum", Gallery Krzywe ZwierciadloZielona Gora, Poland
 2013 : Honorable Mention National Competition of Satirical Artwork "Olsztyn 660", Olsztyn, Poland
 2013 : The City of Zyrardow Mayor's Prize, 4th National Competition for satyrical artwork "Manufaktura Satyry", Zyrardow, Poland
 2014 : Prize of SPAK, Association of The Polish Artists of Caricature, 5th National Competition of Satirical Artwork "Manufaktura Satyry", Zyrardow, Poland
 2017 : 1st Prize in 8th National Competition of Satirical Artwork "Manufaktura Satyry", Zyrardow, Poland

Books

Pijet is an author of six books: 
 Arbalet: En vert et contre tous, satirical story about the last leaving tree on the Earth
 The Great Finals
 Toute vérité est bonne à rire
 Les Éditions PIJET 2000
 Piégé par l'amour
 Les Cantons – Rondel et Baton à la conquête du Saladier d'argent

Paintings

Pijet is known for his paintings as well. There have been several exhibitions in Montreal of his work.

Exhibitions

Individual exhibitions 
 1987: Galerie Wieza Cisnien, "Pijet", drawings exhibition, Zielona Gora, Poland
 1993: Complexe Desjardins, "André Pijet : Personnalités politiques", drawings exhibition, Montreal, Quebec, Canada
 1993: The International Museum "Just for Laughs", "Pijet : Les finales de la coupe Stanley", drawings exhibition, Montreal, Quebec, Canada
 1993: La promenade Fleury, "Coupe Stanley de Pijet", drawings exhibition, Montreal, Quebec, Canada
 1993: Maison de la culture Rosemont – Petite – Patrie, "André Pijet: Caricaturiste", drawings exhibition, Montreal, Quebec, Canada
 1994: Maison de la culture Mercier, "Rétrospective : Pijet", drawings exhibition, Montreal, Quebec, Canada
 1994: Complexe Desjardins, "Pijet en Rétrospective", drawing exhibition, Montreal, Quebec, Canada
 2001: "Piégé par l'amour," The 20th International Exhibition of the Press Cartoon and Humor, painting exhibition, Saint-Just-Le-Martel, France
 2001: The Gallery of the Fine Arts Museum, "Pijet l'Amour",  painting exhibition, Montreal, Quebec, Canada
 2003: Place Desjardins Grand hall, "l'Amour," paintings exhibition, Montreal, Quebec, Canada
 2008: Gallery Arte Bella, "Mathamorphic Impressions", painting exhibition, Montreal, Quebec, Canada
 2009: Maison de la culture Ahuntsic-Cartierville, "Le Grandes Finales du Canadien des Années 90", exhibition of artwork published in Montreal daily La Presse
 2013: Galerie Carlos. "Les Impressions contemporaines," painting exhibition, Montreal, Quebec, Canada
 2014: Galerie Carlos. "Les Impressions métamorphiques," painting exhibition, Montreal, Quebec, Canada
 2015: Galerie Carlos. "Les Impressions urbaines," painting exhibition, Montreal, Quebec, Canada
 2016: Galerie Studio 325. "Les Inspirations 2011–2016", painting exhibition, Montreal, Quebec, Canada
 2017: The "Open Studio" Exhibit 2017", painting exhibition, Montreal, Quebec, Canada

Group exhibitions 
 1983–2013 : Participation in national and international group exhibitions: 'Montreal, Toronto, Ottawa, Poland, Greece, France, Luxembourg, Italy, Swiss, Belgique, England, Russia, Turkey, Bulgaria, Serbia, Venezuela
 2006 : Place des Arts, Montreal, Quebec, Canada, organized by 1001 Visages
 2007 : International exhibition, Bain Mathieu, Montreal, Quebec, Canada, organized by 1001 Visages
 2008 : The Humorists, maison de la culture Frontenac, Montreal, Quebec, Canada, organized by 1001 Visages

External links 
  André Pijet official website
 André Pijet is a member of FECO France
 André Pijet is a member of IQ

1954 births
20th-century Canadian painters
Canadian male painters
21st-century Canadian painters
20th-century Polish painters
20th-century Canadian male artists
21st-century Polish painters
21st-century Canadian male artists
Artists from Montreal
Canadian comics artists
Polish comics artists
Canadian editorial cartoonists
Polish cartoonists
Canadian illustrators
Canadian caricaturists
Polish illustrators
Polish caricaturists
Living people
Polish male painters